Sha Tin Heights is a  tall hill located in Tai Wai, Sha Tin District, in Hong Kong's New Territories.

Residential area 
The Sha Tin Heights area is located close to Kam Shan Country Park. Currently, this area primarily consists of upmarket residences, concentrating on the two sides of Sha Tin Heights Road.

Transport 

The hill is the site of Sha Tin Heights Tunnel and nearby Eagle's Nest Tunnel, a major infrastructure project in the area.

See also 
 List of mountains, peaks and hills in Hong Kong

References 

Tai Wai